Bartholomew Street is a major thoroughfare in Newbury, Berkshire, UK.

Geography 
Bartholomew Street runs from the A343 at the south end to Newbury Bridge (over the River Kennet) at the north end.  Points of interest on the street include the Black Boys Bridge (adjacent to Newbury railway station), the Phoenix Brewery, the Kennet Centre, and St Nicolas Church, Newbury.

Just south of the Kennet bridge, the section of the road bordering the Kennet Centre (measuring ) is pedestrianised.

Roads in Berkshire